Devil's Playground is the sixth studio album by English rock vocalist Billy Idol, released on 22 March 2005. It is his first studio album in over a decade (the latest being 1993's Cyberpunk), and his first new studio songs since 2001 (Idol's cover of "Don't You (Forget About Me)" on Greatest Hits). The album also reunited Idol in the studio with guitarist Steve Stevens and producer Keith Forsey. All songs were written or co-written by Idol except "Plastic Jesus". The album was engineered and mixed by Brian Reeves at the Jungle Room in Los Angeles. 

During the recording of the album, the crew of the TV show Bands Reunited ambushed the Jungle Room and tried to convince Billy to reunite with his old band Generation X for a one night performance, but Idol slammed the door on them, leading to an apology by the crew.

Idol and the band supported the album with a world tour of rock festival appearances in 2005 and 2006, including several performances on the Vans Warped Tour.

The song "Scream" was used in an episode of Viva La Bam, in which Idol also guest starred, where he and Bam Margera sing it as they go down the highway.

Critical reception
Devil's Playground was met with "mixed or average" reviews from critics. At Metacritic, which assigns a weighted average rating out of 100 to reviews from mainstream publications, this release received an average score of 52 based on 11 reviews.

In a review for AllMusic, Stephen Thomas Erlewine wrote: "On this pair of hooky, catchy tunes named after girls, Devil's Playground points toward an interesting, fruitful direction for Idol – one that acknowledges his veteran status without sounding aged – that he hopefully may wind up taking next time out.".

Track listing

Charts

Personnel
Billy Idol – vocals
Steve Stevens – guitar
Stephen McGrath – bass guitar
Derek Sherinian – keyboards
Brian Tichy – percussion, drums
Julian Beeston – drum programming
Kevin Anderson—keyboards (uncredited)

References

2005 albums
Billy Idol albums
Albums produced by Keith Forsey
Sanctuary Records albums